The Ottawa Titans were a Junior "A" box lacrosse team from Ottawa, Ontario, Canada. The Titans played in the OLA Junior A Lacrosse League from 2005 to 2007.
The Titans suspended their operations for the 2008 and 2009 seasons, and are not likely to return.

History
The Ottawa Titans were established in 2005 and played in the Ontario Lacrosse Associations Jr. A circuit.

Season-by-season results
Note: GP = Games played, W = Wins, L = Losses, T = Ties, Pts = Points, GF = Goals for, GA = Goals against

The Titans have suspended operations for the 2008 and 2009 seasons and did not return.

External links
Titans Webpage
The Bible of Lacrosse
Unofficial OLA Page

Ontario Lacrosse Association teams
Tit